Phills may refer to:

a nickname for the Philadelphia Phillies, a Major League Baseball team
Bobby Phills (1969–2000), an American basketball player